Nufenen Pass (Italian: Passo della Novena, German: Nufenenpass) (el. 2478 m.) is the highest mountain pass with a paved road within Switzerland. It lies between the summits of Pizzo Gallina (north) and the Nufenenstock (south).

The pass road from Ulrichen in canton of Valais leads to the Bedretto valley in the canton of Ticino, linking Brig to Airolo. It is not the lowest pass between the two valleys, as it is located one kilometre north of an unnamed slightly lower pass at 2,440 metres (vs 2478 m.), which is traversed by a trail.

The road is of relatively recent construction, having been opened to motor vehicle traffic only since September 1969.

The source of the Ticino River lies east of the top of the pass.   Towards the north are views of the Bernese Alps, including the Finsteraarhorn while there is a view over the Gries Glacier to the south.

See also
 List of highest paved roads in Europe
 List of mountain passes

Bibliography
 Nicola Pfund, Sui passi in bicicletta - Swiss Alpine passes by bicycle, Fontana Edizioni, 2012, p. 54-61.

Sources and further reading
  This article incorporates information from the equivalent article in the German Wikipedia, consulted during April 2009.

External links 

Cycling Map, Elevation Profile, and Photos
Profile on climbbybike.com
Cycling up to the Nufenenpass: data, profile, map, photos and description

Mountain passes of Ticino
Mountain passes of the Alps
Mountain passes of Valais
Ticino–Valais border